The Gosport Conservative Party parliamentary primary of 2009 was the 1st open primary election used to select the Conservative Prospective Parliamentary Candidate for the constituency of Gosport. The election was held on Friday 4 December 2009 under the first-past-the-post system. The incumbent MP, Sir Peter Viggers, had announced his intention to decline re-election following the parliamentary expenses scandal, in which he gained huge media attention for attempting to claim £1,645 for a duck house.

Background
On 21 May 2009, The Daily Telegraph reported that Sir Peter Viggers, MP for Gosport, had claimed over £30,000 in gardening expenses over three years. Details of a "pond feature" worth £1,645, identified as a "floating duck island", were also published. On hearing that the national newspaper would be running the story on the front page the next day, Viggers announced that he would resign at the next election. The floating duck house claim later became a symbol of the Westminster expenses scandal.

The Chairman of the Gosport Constituency Conservative Association was accused of sexism after he told Channel 4 News that he would happily appoint a female candidate if she were attractive. This followed remarks by a local councillor, saying that his application to succeed Viggers had been rejected by Conservative Campaign Headquarters, perhaps because he was "a man and too old".

Following the successfully high turnout at the Totnes primary, David Cameron announced that further open primary elections would be used to select parliamentary candidates. On 28 October, it was revealed that Gosport would hold an open primary in December, following a public hustings in the final fortnight of the campaign. Party Chairman Eric Pickles confirmed the news and noted that, "it is vital to empower local people and allow them to have the final say".

Campaign
The procedure for the primary process determined that the number of candidates would be shortlisted to six, by the Gosport Constituency Conservative Association. A second shortlist would then be drawn up, eliminating two candidates. The four remaining candidates would appear on the ballot. Ballot papers were sent to every registered voter in the Gosport constituency via a postal vote, regardless of their political affiliation on 12 November. On 20 November, a public hustings involving the four candidates took place. The deadline for the return of ballot papers was established to be three weeks after their initial launch on 4 December - the result was declared on the same day.

Candidates
First Shortlist

The six candidates in the first shortlist were:
James Bethell, 5th Baron Bethell, Director of Westbourne Communications and former managing director of the Ministry of Sound. Joined the House of Lords in July 2018, after successfully contesting a Conservative Party hereditary peers' by-election.
 Maria Caulfield, party activist in Sussex and a councillor on the Brighton & Hove City Council. Later became MP for Lewes in the 2015 general election.
 Caroline Dinenage, unsuccessful Conservative candidate for Portsmouth South in the 2005 general election and local business owner
 Sam Gyimah, a businessman and Chairman of the Bow Group (2006-7). Became MP for East Surrey at the 2010 general election.
 Julia Manning, a former NHS optometrist and founder of the independent think tank, 2020Health
 John Moss, later stood as the Conservative candidate for City and East in the 2012 London Assembly election

Second Shortlist

The four candidates in the final shortlist were:
James Bethell, 5th Baron Bethell
 Caroline Dinenage
 Sam Gyimah
 Julia Manning

Criticism
The first shortlist was met with criticism due to the lack of candidates from the borough of Gosport. Conservative Party members in Gosport were reported in the local media to be angered that CCHQ had used the primary election to select A-List candidates to a safe Conservative seat.

Results

See also
 Conservative Party (UK) parliamentary primaries
 Totnes Conservative primary, 2009

References

External links
 Gosport Constituency Conservative Association
 ConservativeHome blog of the 2009 Gosport primary campaign

2009 elections in the United Kingdom
Gosport
Conservative Party (UK) parliamentary primaries
Politics of Gosport
2000s in Hampshire
Elections in Hampshire